Chinnery is a surname. Notable people with the surname include:

Broderick Chinnery (1742–1808), Irish politician and baronet
Dennis Chinnery (1927–2012), British actor
Derek Chinnery (1925–2015), controller of BBC Radio 1
Doug Chinnery (b. 1964), landscape photographer
Ernest Chinnery, Australian anthropologist
Esmé Chinnery (1886–1915), English soldier and aviator
George Chinnery, English painter
George Chinnery (bishop) (d.1780), Anglican bishop in Ireland
Harry Chinnery (1876–1916), English cricketer
Patrick Chinnery, professor of neurogenetics at the University of Cambridge
Sarah Chinnery (1887–1970), British-Australian photographer
Tony Chinnery, builder of historical keyboard instruments